Aboriginal communities in Western Australia are communities for Aboriginal Australians within their ancestral country; the communities comprise families with continuous links to country that extend before the European settlement of Australia.

The governments of Australia and Western Australia have supported and funded these communities in a number of ways for over 40 years; prior to that Indigenous people were non citizens with no rights, forced to work for sustenance on stations as European settlers divided up the areas, or relocated under various Government acts.

Aboriginal Communities Act 1979
The Aboriginal Communities Act 1979 allowed Aboriginal councils to make and enforce by-laws on their land. Originally it only applied to the Bidyadanga and Bardi communities, but was subsequently extended to others.

Earlier stages of assistance
In the  1980s and 1990s, effort was made to support indigenous communities.

Politicisation of funding issues
In 2014 and 2015 the support of some of the communities was questioned in Western Australian and Australian political discussions.

In 2015 rallies were held across Australia and the world to protest the withdrawal of government support of the communities. A group of Aboriginal protesters set up a camp on Heirisson Island, as "... a place of retreat for all Aboriginal persons who have been and will be forcibly removed by the West Australian Government".

See also
 List of Aboriginal communities in Western Australia

Notes

External links
Maps of indigenous communities in Western Australia, Department of Indigenous Affairs
 Layout plans for Aboriginal settlements in WA, at the Department of Planning Lands and Heritage